YoungJu Choie (born June 15, 1959) is a South Korean mathematician who works as a professor of mathematics at the Pohang University of Science and Technology (POSTECH). Her research interests include number theory and modular forms.

Education and career
Choie graduated from Ewha Womans University in 1982, and earned a doctorate in 1986 from Temple University under the supervision of Marvin Knopp. After temporary positions at Ohio State University and the University of Maryland, she became an assistant professor at University of Colorado in 1989, and moved to POSTECH as a full professor in 1990. Choie became a Fellow of the American Mathematical Society in 2013.

Mathematical work 
Choie works on various aspects of Jacobi forms. Together with Winfried Kohnen, she has proved upper bounds on the first sign change of Fourier coefficients of cusp forms, generalizing the work of Siegel.

Selected works 

 R. Bruggeman, Y. Choie and N. Diamantis, Holomorphic automorphic forms and cohomology, Memoirs of the American Mathematical Society,   253 (2018), no. 1212, vii+167 pp.  
 D. Bump and Y. Choie, “Schubert Eisenstein series”, American Journal of Mathematics Vol 136, No 6, Dec 2014, 1581-1608.
 Y. Choie and W. Kohnen, “The first sign change of Fourier coefficients of cusp forms”, American Journal of Mathematics 131 (2009), no. 2, 517-543.
 Y. Choie and D. Zagier, “Rational period functions for PSL(2, Z)”, Contemporary Mathematics, A tribute to Emil Grosswald: Number Theory and Related Analysis, 143, 89-108, 1993.
(Book) Y. Choie and MH. Lee, "Jacobi-Like Forms, Pseudodifferential Operators, and Quasimodular Forms”, 318 pages, Springer Monographs in Mathematics on Springer Verlag 2019 (eBook )
 (Book) M. Shi, Y. Choie, A. Sharma and P. Sole, “Codes and Modular forms”, World Scientific,  (hardcover) | December 2019 Pages: 232

Service
Choie has been an editor of International Journal of Number Theory since 2004. In 2010–2011 she was editor-in-chief of the Bulletin of the Korean Mathematical Society.  She became a president of the society of Korean Women in Mathematical Sciences in 2017.
Selective Public Service: 
 2020-2022: NCsoft, Non-executive director 
 2019-2020:  The Presidential Advisory Council on Science and Technology, Deliberative Member, Republic of Korea.
 2019-2020: University Councilor, Representative of Faculty at POSTECH, Pohang, Korea
 2019-2020: Academic vice president of Korean Mathematical Society, Korea
 2018-2021: Non-standing member of Board of Trustees, UNIST(Ulsan Institute of Science and Technology), Korea
 2018-2020: Non-standing member of Board of Trustees, NRF(National Research Foundation), Korea
 2018–2020, 2009-2013: Director of Pohang Mathematical Institute, POSTECH, Korea
 2017.12-2019.11: Member, General review committee for academic research supporting the field of education, Ministry of Education 
 2017-2018: Science and Technology Innovation Board, Ministry of Science and Technology Information and communication
 2018-2019/2020-2021 : Vice President of KOFWST/Auditor, Korea
 2018-2019:  Chief of section committee of group activities of KOFWST, Korea
 2018: University councilor of POSTECH , Representative of Faculty
 2017: KWMS (Korea Women in Mathematical Sciences), President, 20170101-20171231
 2016-2017: KOFWST(Korea Federation of Women’s Sciences and Technology Academics) Member of the board of trustee
 2016-2018: IMU Committee for Women in Mathematics (CWM) ambassadors
 2015-2016: CRB(Chief of Research Board), National Research Foundation
 2009-2015: Organizing Committee, 2014 Seoul ICM, Seoul, Korea
 2013-2015: Organizing committee, ICWM, 2014, Seoul.
 2008-2009: ICM-2014 Seoul Bitteing committee.
 2007-2009: Head of Department of Mathematics, POSTECH, Pohang, Korea.
 2006:WISE Mentoring Fellow, 2006-
 2004-2007, 2012: KWMS(Korean Women in Mathematical Sciences), Board of Trustees:

Recognition
Choie has received several awards such as "The best Journal Paper Award (2002)" from the Korean Mathematical Society,  "Kwon, Kyungwhan" Chaired Professor (2004) at Pohang University of Science and Technology, "The best woman Scientist of the year" award (2005) from Ministry of Science and Technology, "Amore-Pacific The best Women in Science and Technology" (2007), KOFWST (Korea Federation of Woman's Science and Technology Association) and the "2014 Distinguished research" award from Ministry of Education of Korea. In 2013, Choie became one of the inaugural fellows of the American Mathematical Society. Choie became the first female mathematician as member of the Korean Academy of Science and Technology in 2018., retrieved 2018-12-22. She was the first female mathematician who received (2018) the academic award of Korean Mathematical Society.

References

1959 births
Living people
21st-century South Korean mathematicians
South Korean women mathematicians
Number theorists
Ewha Womans University alumni
Temple University alumni
University of Colorado faculty
Academic staff of Pohang University of Science and Technology
Fellows of the American Mathematical Society
20th-century women mathematicians
21st-century women mathematicians
20th-century South Korean mathematicians